The A65 is a major road in England. It runs north west from Leeds in West Yorkshire via Kirkstall, Horsforth, Yeadon, Guiseley, Ilkley and Skipton, west of Settle, Ingleton and Kirkby Lonsdale before terminating at Kendal in Cumbria.

Bypasses

Listed from south to north, beginning at Leeds:

 The  £5.5 million dual-carriageway Burley in Wharfedale Bypass opened in April 1995.
 The  £4 million Addingham bypass opened in January 1991.
 The £2.8 million Draughton Bypass opened in December 1991.
 The north section of the £16.4 million Skipton Bypass opened in December 1981, which is part of the A59.
 North of Skipton, where the road meets the busy A629 from Bradford, there have been plans for a bypass around Gargrave, which is where the road crosses the Pennine Way.
 The  £8.5 million Settle & Giggleswick Bypass opened in December 1988.
 The  Clapham bypass is the earliest of these bypasses. The National Archives have a file "West Riding CC: Clapham Bypass (A65); consideration of proposals" covering 1948–1969.

Road safety
The A65 between Long Preston and junction 36 of the M6 motorway has a poor safety record, according to EuroRAP being listed as a medium-high risk road. This  stretch of single carriageway road suffered 48 fatal or serious injury accidents between 2002 and 2004. The road features in the list of highest risk roads in Britain (excluding motorcycle accidents). The section between Leeds and Long Preston is listed as being a low-medium risk road.

Junctions (A/B roads)

 A58 Leeds Inner Ring Road (start)
 B6157 Kirkstall
 A6120 Horsforth
 B6152 Rawdon
 A658 Yeadon
 B6153 Guiseley (demerge)
 A6038 Guiseley (merge)
 A6038 Menston (demerge)
 A660 Burley in Wharfedale (merge)
 B6382 Ben Rhydding (demerge)
 B6382 Ilkley (merge)
 A6034 & B6160 Addingham
 A6069 Skipton (demerge)
 A59 Skipton (merge)
 A6131 Skipton (demerge)
 B6265 Skipton
 A59 & A629 Skipton (demerge)
 B6253 Hellifield (demerge)
 A682 Long Preston (merge)
 B6478 Long Preston (demerge)
 B6480 near Settle (demerge)
 B6480 (merge)
 B6480 Clapham (demerge)
 B6480 Clapham (merge)
 B6480 Newby (demerge)
 B6255 Ingleton (demerge)
 A687 Ingleton (demerge)
 A683 Kirkby Lonsdale (merge)
 A683 Kirkby Lonsdale (demerge)
 B6254 Kirkby Lonsdale (demerge)
 B6446 Kirkby Lonsdale (merge)
 A6070 (merge) & A590 (demerge) near M6 Junction 36
 B6385 Crooklands (demerge)
 B6254 Kendal (merge)
 A6 Kendal (demerge)
 A6 Kendal (demerge)
 A6 Kendal (demerge)
 A684 Kendal (end)

References

Roads in Cumbria
Roads in England
Roads in Yorkshire
Transport in North Yorkshire
Transport in West Yorkshire